Tamalín is a municipality located in the north zone in the State of Veracruz. It has a surface of 417.85 km2. By Decree of November 13, 1875 there was raised in municipality Tamalín's congregation that concerned to Tantima's municipality.

Geography

Tamalín lies on the west shore of Tamiahua Lagoon. The municipality is delimited to the north and north-west by Ozuluama, to the east by Tamiahua, and to the south by Tancoco, Naranjos Amatlán and Chinampa de Gorostiza.

Agriculture

It produces principally maize, beans, watermelon and orange fruit

Celebrations

In  Tamalín , in July  takes place the celebration in honor to Virgen de Guadalupe, Patron of the town.

Weather

The weather in  Tamalín  is very warm and wet all year with rains in summer and autumn.

References

External links 

  Municipal Official webpage
  Municipal Official Information

Municipalities of Veracruz